Shanghai Port FC, previously named Shanghai SIPG, is a professional football club that participates in the Chinese Super League under licence from the Chinese Football Association (CFA). The team is based in Pudong, Shanghai, and their home stadium is the Pudong Football Stadium, which has a seating capacity of 37,000. Their owners are the Chinese group Shanghai International Port Group (SIPG).

The club was founded on 25 December 2005 as Shanghai East Asia FC by former Chinese international footballer Xu Genbao. The club used graduates from the Genbao Football Base, a football academy also founded by Xu, to form their first team as they made their debut in the third tier of China's football league pyramid in the 2006 league season. They worked their way up to the top tier and finished as league champions for the first time in the 2018 Chinese Super League season.

According to the Forbes report from 2015, Shanghai Port FC was the third-most valuable football club in China, with a club value of $159 million and an estimated revenue of $37 million.

History

2005–2007: League Two
On 16 May 2000, the former Chinese international football coach Xu Genbao founded the Genbao Football Base and enrolled 96 academy members born between 1988 and 1991, who were to be trained in the recently built Genbao Football Base Arena.

Initially, Xu Genbao had no intention of establishing a professional football club. However, as the youngsters in the Base grew up, the lack of youth football competition in China prompt Xu to set up a football club so that his protégés could earn match experiences in professional football. On 25 December 2005, Shanghai East Asia Football Club was jointly established by Xu Genbao and Shanghai East Asia Sports and Culture Center Co. Ltd, with Xu Genbao being the club chairman. Xu appointed Claude Lowitz, a French youth coach in the Base, as the team manager.

With young players aged between 14 and 17, Shanghai East Asia competed in the 2006 China League Two, the third-tier of the Chinese league system. The team played their home games at Genbao Football Base Arena training ground in Chongming, Shanghai, and eventually finished their first season in seventh place. During the campaign, Xu's players broke a few records during the season, with Cao Yunding being the youngest Chinese goalscorer aged 16 years and 242 days, and Wu Lei the youngest Chinese professional footballer, aged only 14 years and 287 days.

At the end of 2006, Claude Lowitz left the club, and former assistant manager Jiang Bingyao took up the manager position. With lessons learned and experiences gained from their debutante season, the young East Asia FC went on to win the division title in 2007, by beating Sichuan in the final, and thus gaining promotion to China League One, the second-tier of the football league.

2008–2012: League One
Despite the successful promotion, questions arose as to what would happen to the team, especially given that Xu's previous efforts to create a professional club (Shanghai 02) ended up being sold off to Shanghai Shenhua in 2002 due to financial difficulties. In June 2007, Shanghai government came to Xu's rescue with financial aid, in exchange East Asia FC would represent Shanghai in the 2009 National Games of China.

With the club in a higher division, Shanghai East Asia moved into the 30,000 seater Jinshan Sports Centre in Jinshan District of Shanghai and finished the 2008 China League One division campaign in sixth place. In summer 2009, Shanghai East Asia represented the Shanghai football team and took part in the 2009 National Games. Xu Genbao took up the management post himself and led the team to win gold in the men's football tournament. Meanwhile, in the league, Shanghai East Asia chose the 65,000 seater Shanghai Stadium as their home stadium for their 2009 China League One campaign. They finished the season in fourth place and just missed out on promotion by a single win, but it was still considered quite an achievement because that team was made up of players under 20 years old, and with no foreign imports.

The 2010 league season saw former Chinese international Fan Zhiyi receive his first management job at the club as well as the introduction of their first-ever foreign players in Macedonian Nikola Karçev and Haitian Fabrice Noël. Despite these new signings the club failed to improve upon the previous season's results and finished in fourth place. Failure to gain promotion and financial difficulties caused the club unable to hold onto their rising stars. Before the 2011 season, five of the team's starting players left the club: team captain Wang Jiayu, Chinese international Zhang Linpeng, and Chinese under-23 players Cao Yunding, Jiang Zhipeng, and Gu Chao. In the following 2011 season, Xu Genbao promoted several young players into the first team and the team finished the season in ninth place.

At the beginning of the 2012 season the club sold their team name to sponsor, Zobon Group for 30 million Yuan on a three-year deal, which saw the club change first team's name to Shanghai Tellace on 31 December 2011, while the club's name remains unchanged as Shanghai East Asia. At the end of the season, they won the league title and was promoted to the Chinese Super League.

2013–present: CSL
On 28 December 2012, Shanghai East Asia changed its first team name again to Port Shanghai F.C., under a 40-million Yuan sponsorship deal with Shanghai International Port. Within the off-season, on 7 January 2013, the club officially acquired another Shanghai-based football club, Shanghai Zobon, which had previously played in the 2012 China League Two division before they were dissolved. Most of its players, born between 1993 and 1994 and graduated from Genbao Football Base, were brought back under Xu Genbao's wing and would become the reserve team of Shanghai East Asia. In the club's debut within the top tier they brought in former Chinese national team manager Gao Hongbo as their head coach and he would go on to guide the club to a ninth-place finish at the end of the 2013 league season. The Shanghai International Port would decide to strengthen their position within the club and officially took over the whole club on 18 November 2014 and immediately appointed Sven-Göran Eriksson as their new head coach.

During the 2015 winter transfer window, Shanghai SIPG signed eight new players to strengthen the squad: Sun Xiang, Davi Rodrigues de Jesus, Dario Conca, Kim Ju-Young, Yang Boyu, Shi Ke, Jean Evrard Kouassi, and Yu Hai – who the club spent 50 million Yuan on. It became the highest transfer record of any Chinese player. The team won the first three games of the season, which creates their best CSL league start in the history. On 9 May, Shanghai SIPG secured a 5–0 victory over their rival Shanghai Greenland Shenhua, and it was their first victory in the Shanghai Derby. The team signed Ghanaian player Asamoah Gyan in the summer transfer window. Jean Evrard Kouassi was dropped into the reserve team due to the registration restriction at that time (4 foreign players + 1 Asian foreign player). Shanghai SIPG finished the season in second place with 65 points – just two points behind the champions Guangzhou Evergrande. It was their best league position in the club's history and they managed to get into the AFC Champions League qualification.

In the beginning of 2016, SAIC Motor Corporation became one of Shanghai SIPG's main sponsors. The club signed former AFC Champions League & CSL golden boot winner Elkeson from Guangzhou Evergrande for €18.5 million. It broke the record of the Chinese transfer market. On 9 February, the team secured a 3–0 victory over Muang Thong United from Thailand in the AFC Champions League qualification round, and successfully went in to the group stage of the ACL. Shanghai SIPG went through the group stage in first place. In the round of 16, Shanghai SIPG faced FC Tokyo. They lost 2–1 away in the first leg, yet thanks to Wu Lei's late 90th-minute goal in the second leg, the team went through the round of 16 with an away goal difference. During the summer transfer window, Shanghai SIPG spent €56 million to sign the Brazilian international Hulk. The team was eliminated in the ACL quarter-finals, and in the CSL, the team ended up in third place with 52 points.

In 2018, Shanghai rode the momentum of Wu Lei, who was the league's top scorer in that year, to win their first-ever CSL title. In 2019, they won the Super Cup for their second top tier trophy.

Ownership and naming history

Rivalries

The club's main rival is against Shanghai Shenhua with whom they contest in the local Shanghai derby. With the club's founder Xu Genbao having managed Shenhua to the 1995 league title, the Shenhua tie holds a direct personal link between the two teams. On 28 April 2013 the two sides met for the first time in a league game that saw the club defeated 2–1 to Shenhua. The tie against Shanghai Shenxin also holds strong links between the two teams with Jiang Zhipeng and Wang Jiayu both having represented both teams before the two clubs met in their first derby on 2 June 2013, which resulted in a 6–1 victory. The club's geographical location has also opened them up to rivalries with neighbouring clubs Hangzhou Greentown and Jiangsu Guoxin-Sainty with whom they contest the Yangtze Delta Derby.

Players

First team squad

Coaching staff

Managerial history

 Claude Lowitz (2006)
 Jiang Bingyao (2007–2009)
 Fan Zhiyi (2010)
 Jiang Bingyao (January 2011 – 20 December 2012)
 Gao Hongbo (27 February 2013 – 7 November 2013)
 Xi Zhikang (4 December 2013 – 17 November 2014)
 Sven-Göran Eriksson (18 November 2014 – 4 November 2016)
 André Villas-Boas (4 November 2016 – 30 November 2017)
 Vítor Pereira (13 December 2017 – 31 December 2020)
 Ivan Leko (1 January 2021 – 1 December 2022)
 Xi Zhikang (1 December 2022 – 28 February 2023)
 Javier Pereira (1 March 2023 – present)

Honours

League
 Chinese Super League
 Winners: 2018
 Runners-up: 2015, 2017, 2021
 China League One 
 Winners: 2012
 China League Two
 Winners: 2007
Cup
 Chinese FA Cup
 Runners-up: 2017, 2021

 Chinese FA Super Cup
 Winners: 2019

Results

Season-by-season rankings

 In group stage
 The season was shortened due to the COVID-19 pandemic
 Lost in the semifinals
 Withdrew from the competition due to the COVID-19 lockdown measures

Key
<div>

 Div = Division
 Pld = Played
 W = Games won
 D = Games drawn
 L = Games lost
 GF = Goals for
 GA = Goals against
 GD = Goal difference

 Pts. = Points
 Pos. = Final position
 DNQ = Did not qualify
 DNE = Did not enter
 NH = Not held
 R2 = Round 2
 R3 = Round 3
 R4 = Round 4

 QF = Quarter-finals
 SF = Semi-finals

International results
All results list Shanghai's goal tally first.

References

External links
Official website

 
Association football clubs established in 2005
Football clubs in Shanghai
2005 establishments in China
Chinese Super League clubs